Robert M. La Follette High School is a public school located in Madison, Wisconsin, serving the city's far east side with its attendance boundaries including parts of the City of Madison, City of Fitchburg, Town of Blooming Grove, and Town of Burke, teaching students in grades 9-12. Founded in the fall of 1963, it is a part of the Madison Metropolitan School District, and is named after former lawmaker and 1924 presidential candidate Robert M. La Follette, Sr.

Academics
La Follette offers diverse academic opportunities, drawing upon its 14 academic departments and more than 150 faculty offering instruction in more than 250 courses in 100 different fields of study. Courses are taught in a variety of academic settings, from traditional classrooms to community-based service experiences. Additional opportunities for growth and leadership are offered through involvement in numerous student organizations. The school began offering American sign language as a foreign language in 1998, and other schools have modeled their programs after La Follette's.

Academic departments
Applied Technology 
Art
AVID/TOPS
Business, Marketing, and IT
English
Family and Consumer Education
Math
Multilingual Education (ESL)
Music
Physical Education and Health
Science
Social Studies
Special Education
World Languages

Extra-curricular activities

Clubs
La Follette offers nearly four dozen extra-curricular clubs, spanning a wide variety of student interests, including academic, athletic, social, fine arts, science, health and others, such as gaming clubs.

Athletics
La Follette athletics include girls' volleyball, boys' volleyball, girls' soccer, boys' soccer, boys' basketball, girls' basketball, wrestling, boys' track & field, girls' track & field, football, girls' swim, boys' swim, boys' cross country, girls' cross country, dance, cheer, hockey, girls' golf, boys' golf, baseball, softball, girls' tennis, boys' tennis. Club sports include basketball, rugby, bowling, ultimate frisbee and volleyball.

Other notable athletic achievements
 1978 WIAA Girls Softball State Runner Ups
 1979 WIAA Class A Girls Softball State Runner Ups
 1986 WIAA Class A Girls Softball State Runner Ups 
 1988 WIAA Division 1 Boys Volleyball State Runner Ups
 1993 WIAA Division 1 Wrestling Individual State Champion, Chad Powell
 1993 WACPC Competition Dance D1 State Champions
 1994 WACPC Competition Nationals D1 Competitors
 1995 WACPC Competition Dance D1 State Champions
 2003 WIAA Division I Boys Tennis Individual State Champion, Pete Amundson
 2006 WACPC Competition Cheer D1 Small State Champions 
 2007 WACPC Competition Cheer D1 Small State Champions 
 2010 WIAA Division 1 State Baseball Runner Ups
 2011 WACPC Competition Cheer D1 Small State Champions  
 2011 WIAA Division 1 Boys Cross Country Individual State Champion, Chandler Diffee
 2011 WIAA Division 1 Girls Discus Individual State Champion, KeKe Burks
 2012 WIAA Division 1 Boys Cross Country Runner Ups
 2013 WACPC Competition Cheer D1 Small State Champions
 2014 WACPC Competition Cheer D1 Small State Champions  
 2015 WIAA Division 1 Boys Cross Country Individual State Champion, Finn Gessner
 2015 WIAA Division 1 Boys Cross Country Runner Ups 
 2016 WIAA Division 1 Boys Cross Country Individual State Champion, Finn Gessner
 2022 WIAA Division 1 Wrestling Individual State Champion, Jackson Mankowski

Other activities and events

Arboretum
La Follette has one of the few on-ground arboretums in the state. It was designed to have three ecosystems, including prairie, woodland and pond.

Board of visitors
La Follette's board of visitors serves as an advocate for the school, and is the only school in the Madison area, and possibly the state, which has such a board. Drawing upon experiences and resources of alumni, parents and other patrons, the board's mission is to empower students and faculty while building community. The board assists in fundraising, business, community outreach, public affairs, student support and teacher support.

Business
In 2011, Summit Credit Union began operations at La Follette High School. In ensuing years, branches were opened at other Madison-area high schools. The branch is staffed by interns from the La Follette career internship class and is open during the lunch hour.

Presidential visit
On September 28, 2010, the school was visited by President Barack Obama, who made an unannounced stop ahead of a late-afternoon rally on the UW-Madison campus.

Publications
The Lance is the student newspaper for La Follette; its yearbook is known as The Statesman; The Lancer Legend is the parent newsletter.

Notable alumni
Marc Behrend, 1979; former professional hockey player
Craig Brown, 1994; curler
Erika Brown, 1992; curler
Savion Castro, 2012; member of the Board of Education in Madison, Wisconsin
Chuck Chvala, 1973; former State Senate Majority Leader
Brian Detter, 1977; business executive and former defense official
Crystal Graff, 2011; volleyball player
Dianne Hesselbein, 1989; member of Wisconsin State Assembly
Tim Jordan, 1982; former professional football player
Peter Mueller, 1972; speed skater 
Nicole Newman, 2014; softball player
Jeff Nygaard, 1990;  Olympic beach volleyball player, 2004; U.S. Men's Olympic National Indoor team, 1996, 2000
Craig Smith, 2008; current NHL player on Boston Bruins and former University of Wisconsin hockey player
Michael Flowers, 2004; Wisconsin Basketball; All-Big Ten
Jonte Flowers, 2003; Professional Basketball Player
Rick Olson, 1983; Wisconsin Basketball; Houston Rockets; Wisconsin Athletics Hall of Fame
Craig Anderson, Iowa Basketball
Kim Sponem, 1985; president and CEO, Summit Credit Union
Patrick Stiegman, 1984; ESPN vice president

References

External links
 Foundation for Madison's Public Schools -- La Follette
 La Follette board of visitors website
 La Follette boys cross country team's website
 La Follette boys golf team's FB page
 U.S. News & World Report rankings
 Wisconsin Department of Public Instruction data

High schools in Madison, Wisconsin
Educational institutions established in 1963
Public high schools in Wisconsin
1963 establishments in Wisconsin
Robert M. La Follette